KP Technology Ltd was established in 2000 as an international multidisciplinary engineering, science and technology research company offering services particularly in the research, material, energy, defence, environment, corrosion and medical sectors. It specialises in Kelvin probes, surface photovoltage and air photoemission.

KP Technology specialises in design, design support, research and consultancy. It operates in over 35 countries, with primary bases in Europe and North America. It is based in Wick, in the Scottish Highlands and is recognised as a "state of the art" local company.

History 
Originally formed as a spin off from CEO Prof Iain Baikie research, KP Technology has engaged in scientific research for more than a decade.

KP Technology has an active and successful research lab. It has partnered with Harvard University and MIT, CERN Institute, European Space Agency and the University of St Andrews among others.

The company has won two Queens Awards and a John Logie Baird Award for Impact through Innovation.

Notable scientific publications and patents

Collaborative papers
 Work function engineering in low-temperature metals, Appl. Phys. Lett. 94, 113504 (2009);
Affiliations:

Department of Materials Science and Engineering, Massachusetts Institute of Technology, Cambridge, Massachusetts,

Research Laboratory of Electronics, Massachusetts Institute of Technology, Cambridge, Massachusetts 02139,

KP Technology Ltd., Wick KW1 5LE, United Kingdom

Sole papers

 Ambient pressure photoemission spectroscopy of metal surfaces, Applied Surface Science Volume 323, 30 December 2014, Pages 45–53
 Near ambient pressure photoemission spectroscopy of metal and semiconductor surfaces. Phys. Status Solidi C, 12: 259–262.
 Dual Mode Kelvin Probe: Featuring Ambient Pressure Photoemission Spectroscopy and Contact Potential Difference, Energy Procedia Volume 60, 2014, Pages 48-56
Affiliation

KP Technology Ltd, 12 A Burn Street, Wick KW1 5EH, Caithness, UK

Patent
 PCT/GB2013/050427A measurement apparatus for surface analysis carried out in a gaseous environment such as air comprises a measurement device capable of measuring a contact potential difference between a probe and a surface, and a light source that triggers photoelectric emission from a sample. The apparatus may operate in “dual” photoemission and contact potential difference (CPD) measurement modes.

Notable projects
KP Technology developed a NASA  Probe.

Scottish Parliament motion
A motion was passed in the Scottish Parliament congratulating the company."That the parliament congratulates business across Scotland and in particular those in the Highlands and Islands who have scooped the Queens Awards for outstanding achievement; notes that KP Technology Ltd of Wick which manufactures and sells Kelvin Probes used to measure Electronic Work Function received an award; notes the firms have significantly increased their export sales over the past few years and are international success storys that are bucking the economic trend across Scotland and the U.K."

References

2000 establishments in Scotland
Technology companies established in 2000